Brian Edwards may refer to:
 Brian Edwards (broadcaster) (born 1937), Irish-born New Zealand media personality and author
 Brian Edwards (soccer) (born 1984), American soccer player
 Brian Morgan Edwards (1934–2002), Welsh businessman and politician
Brian T. Edwards, American scholar

Bryan Edwards may refer to:
 Bryan Edwards (American football) (born 1998), American football wide receiver
 Bryan Edwards (Australian footballer) (born 1957), Australian rules footballer
 Bryan Edwards (judge) (fl. 1855), Jamaican Chief Justice
 Bryan Edwards (footballer, born 1930) (1930–2016), English footballer and manager
 Bryan Edwards (politician) (1743–1800), British politician and planter